Michael John Elphick (19 September 1946 – 7 September 2002) was an English film and television actor. He played the eponymous private investigator in the ITV series Boon and Harry Slater in BBC's EastEnders. He was nominated for a BAFTA Award for Best Supporting Actor for his performance in the 1983 film Gorky Park.

In his prime, Elphick always looked older than he was, and with his gruff Sussex accent and lip-curling sneer he often played menacing hard men.

Elphick struggled with a highly publicised addiction to alcohol; at the height of his problem he admitted to consuming two litres of spirits a day, which contributed to his death from a heart attack in 2002.

Early life 
Elphick grew up in Chichester, Sussex, where his family had a butcher's shop. He was educated at Lancastrian Secondary Modern Boys School in Chichester, where he took part in several school productions including Noah and A Midsummer Night's Dream. He initially considered joining the Merchant Navy and helped out in his local boatyard during school holidays.

It has been reported that he stumbled upon acting by chance when, at the age of 15, he took a job as an apprentice electrician at the Chichester Festival Theatre while it was being built. He gained an interest in acting whilst watching stars such as Laurence Olivier, Michael Redgrave and Sybil Thorndike. Olivier advised Elphick to go to drama school and gave him two speeches to use at auditions. Elphick was offered a number of places but decided to train at the Central School of Speech and Drama in Swiss Cottage (aged 18), because Olivier had attended there.

Career 
After graduating from drama school Elphick was offered roles primarily as menacing heavies. He made his debut in Fraulein Doktor (an Italian-made First World War film circa 1968). He went on to play the Captain in Tony Richardson's version of Hamlet (1969); landed parts in cult films such as The First Great Train Robbery and The Elephant Man and appeared in Lindsay Anderson's allegorical O Lucky Man! (1973). He was also seen as Phil Daniels' father in the cult film Quadrophenia (1979), as Pasha in Gorky Park (1983) and as the poacher, Jake, in Withnail & I (1987). In 1984 he played the lead, Fisher, a British detective recalling under hypnosis a dystopian, crumbling Europe and his hunt for a serial killer in Lars von Trier's Palme D'Or nominated debut film, The Element of Crime.

On stage, Elphick played Marcellus and the Player King in Tony Richardson's stage version of Hamlet at the Roundhouse Theatre and on Broadway and he later played Claudius to Jonathan Pryce's Hamlet at the Royal Court Theatre, directed by Richard Eyre. In 1981 he appeared in the Ray Davies/Barrie Keeffe musical Chorus Girls at the Theatre Royal, Stratford East and he was also seen in The Changing Room, directed by Lindsay Anderson, at the Royal Court Theatre. His last West End stage appearance was in 1997 as Doolittle in Pygmalion directed by Ray Cooney at the Albery Theatre.

However, it was for his television roles that Elphick became best known. He briefly appeared in Coronation Street (1974) as Douglas Wormold, son of the landlord Edward, who for many years owned most of the properties in the road. Douglas unsuccessfully tried to buy the newsagent shop The Kabin from Len Fairclough. He played three characters in the popular Granada Television series Crown Court—in 1973 as a defendant, in 1975 as a witness (Frank Hollins, private secretary to a female soprano in the episode Songbirds out of Tune), and from 1975 to 1983 as the barrister Neville Griffiths Q.C..

He played one of the main roles in the film Black Island in 1978 for the Children's Film Foundation, played a villain in The Sweeney episode "One of Your Own" (1978) and played a policeman in The Professionals episode "Backtrack" (1979) and had a minor role in Hazell (1979), and appeared in the Dennis Potter play Blue Remembered Hills (1979). Elphick took the title role in Jack Pulman's six part comedy-drama Private Schulz (1981). Here he played alongside Ian Richardson the German forger Gerhard Schulz, who is conscripted into SS Counter Espionage during the Second World War to destroy the British economy by flooding it with forged money.

He appeared as the Irish labourer Magowan during the first series of Auf Wiedersehen, Pet (1983) and starred as Sidney Mundy in the ITV sitcom Pull the Other One (1984), before playing Sam Tyler in four series of Three Up, Two Down (1985–89). In 1986 Elphick landed his biggest television success, Boon (1986–92, 1995). He played Ken Boon, a retired fireman who opened a motorbike despatch business and later became a private investigator. Boon was very successful and ran for seven series, attracting audiences of 11 million at its peak. There was also a one-off episode screened in 1995, two years after it had been made. During breaks from Boon, Elphick continued to act in film with cameo roles in The Krays (1990) and Let Him Have It (1991), and in 1991 he played Des King in Buddy's Song, starring Chesney Hawkes and Roger Daltrey.

In 1993 Elphick took the role of a former Fleet Street journalist running a Darlington news agency in Harry (1993, 1995). He played the alcoholic and ruthless Harry Salter, who frequently used exploitation and underhand tactics to get a story. This series however was less successful and it was soon cancelled. Elphick went on to play Billy Bones in Ken Russell's televised version of Treasure Island (1995) and Barkis in David Copperfield (1999).

In 2001 he joined the cast of EastEnders, where he played Harry Slater, a romantic interest for Peggy Mitchell (Barbara Windsor). The plotline indicated that Slater had sexually abused his niece, Kat Slater (Jessie Wallace), at the age of 13 and her "sister" Zoe (Michelle Ryan) was the daughter born to her when she became pregnant by him. Elphick's heavy drinking began to affect his performances, so the character promptly left the series and was killed off off-screen.

Personal life
Elphick met his long-term partner, schoolteacher Julia Alexander, in 1963 and remained with her until her death from cancer in 1996. The couple had a daughter, Kate.

For many years Elphick struggled with alcoholism. He made the first of many attempts to stop drinking in 1988. He sought help from Alcoholics Anonymous in the early 1990s, although he admitted he was still drinking in 1993. In 1996, he admitted that he had begun drinking heavily again and also contemplated suicide after the death of his partner of 33 years. However he rallied and returned to the stage in Loot. 

The actor also confessed to having taken cocaine and once, while high on drugs, grabbing a shotgun and chasing a gang of thugs after he had been carjacked near his villa in Portugal. 

During the late eighties and early nineties, he had a brief, but ultimately unsuccessful business interest in The White Swan public house at Henley-in-Arden.

Elphick was admitted to the Priory Hospital in Roehampton, in an attempt to beat his addictions. Reports of his alcohol abuse persisted, however, and during his brief spell on EastEnders during 2001, it was reported that the BBC was considering dropping his character if his drinking was not curtailed.

Death 
On 7 September 2002, Elphick died of a heart attack complicated by his drinking problem. He had collapsed at his home in Willesden Green, London, after complaining of pains. He was rushed to hospital where he died, aged 55, shortly before his 56th birthday.

His funeral was held at Chichester Crematorium.

Filmography 

Fraulein Doktor (1968) as Tom
Where's Jack? (1969) as Hogarth
Hamlet (1969) as Captain
Parkin's Patch (1970) as Thomas
The Best Things in Life (1970) as Jed Lucas
Cry of the Banshee (1970) as Burke
The Buttercup Chain (1970) as The Driver
Armchair Theatre (1971) as Robert Delmonds
The Misfit (1971, TV Series) as Mike Halloran
See No Evil (1971) as Gypsy Tom
Albert and Victoria (1971) as Nigel Godfrey
Adult Fun (1972) as Garage Manager
Country Matters (1973) as Jack
Adam Smith (1973) as Ben Davies
O Lucky Man! (1973) as Bill
And Now the Screaming Starts! (1973) as Drunk (uncredited)
Justice (1973, TV Series) as Peter Rodwell
Orson Welles Great Mysteries (1973) as Gorenflot
Amchair Theatre (1973) as Chopper / Best Man
New Scotland Yard (1973) as Al Farmer
Crown Court (1973-1983, TV Series) as Simon Chase
New Scotland Yard (1974) as Joss Adrian
ITV Playhouse (1974-1979, TV Series) as Norma's Friend / Barrister at Partyzs / Oscar / Jack
The Nearly Man (1974) as Ron Hibbert
The Brothers (1974, TV Series) as Patrolman
Coronation Street (1974) as Douglas Wormold
Crown Court (1975–1983, TV Series) as Neville Griffiths QC / Frank Hollins
The Nearly Man (1975) as Ron Hibbert
Three Men in a Boat (1975) as 2nd Porter
Hadleigh (1976, TV Series) as Brian Ainsworth
BBC2 Playhouse (1976) as Frank / Charlie / Eddie
Holding On (1977) as Charlie Wheelright
This Year Next Year (1977) as Jack Shaw
Last Summer (1977) as Oscar
ITV Sunday Night Drama (1977) as Himself
Saturday, Sunday, Monday (1978) as Michel
Hazell (1978, TV Series) as Griffiths
Send in the Girls (1978) as Jimmy
Play for Today (1978-1979, TV Series) as Thomas Venables/Peter
The Ghosts of Motley Hall (1978) as Captain Narcissus Bullock
The Odd Job (1978) as Raymonde
The One and Only Phyllis Dixey (1978) as Wallace Parnell
The Sweeney (1978) as Jimmy Fleet
The Knowledge (1979) as Gordon Weller
The First Great Train Robbery (1979) as Burgess
Quadrophenia (1979) as Jimmy's Father
The Professionals (1979, TV Series) as Sergeant Garbett
The Quiz Kid (1979) as Jack
Black Island (1979) as Jack Daker
Cribb (1980) as Sol Herriott
The Elephant Man (1980) as Night Porter
Shoestring (1980, TV Series) as Pete Johnson
Masada (1981, TV Mini-series) as Vettius
Private Schulz (1981) as Gerhard Schulz
Roger Doesn't Live Here Anymore (1981) as Stanley
Tony (1981–1988, TV Series) as Johnny Magowan
Andy Robson (1982) as Jake Carnaby
Smiley's People (1982, TV Mini-series) as Detective Chief Superintendent
Bird Fancier (1983) as Darville
Bloomfield (1983) as Billy Gibbs
Privates on Parade (1983) as Sergeant Major Reg Drummond
Krull (1983) as Rhun (voice, uncredited)
Curse of the Pink Panther (1983) as Valencia Police Chief
Gorky Park (1983) as Pasha
Auf Wiedersehen, Pet (1983–84) as Magowan
Memed My Hawk (1984) as Jabbar
The Element of Crime (1984) as Fisher
Ordeal by Innocence (1984) as Inspector Huish
Pull the Other One (1984) as Sidney Mundy
Arthur's Hallowed Ground (1984) as Len
Oxbridge Blues (1984) as Curly Bonaventura
Much Ado About Nothing (1984) as Dogberry
Three Up, Two Down (1985–89) as Sam Tyler
Super Gran (1985) as Roly Roofless
Hitler's SS: Portrait in Evil (1985) as Ernst Röhm
Lake Starter (1985) as Jack Owen
Jenny's War (1985) as Schumann
Tony (1985) as Johnny Magowan
The Supergrass (1985) as Constable Collins
Boon (1986–1995, TV Series) as Ken Boon
Pirates (1986) as Sentry
Valhalla (1986) as Udgaardsloki (English version, voice)
Fellows and Magowan (1987–91) as Johnny Magowan
Withnail & I (1987) as Jake
Little Dorrit (1987) as Mr Merdle
Asterix and the Big Fight (1989) as Crysus (English version, voice)
The Krays (1990) as George in Prison (uncredited)
I Bought a Vampire Motorcycle (1990) as Inspector Cleaver
Buddy's Song (1991) as Des King
Let Him Have It (1991) as Prison Officer Jack
Stanley and the Women (1991) as Bert Hutchinson
The Ballad of Kid Divine: The Cockney Cowboy (1992) as Dr. Nathaniel Bonner
Harry (1993–1995, TV Series) as Harry Salter
Murder Most Horrid (1994) as Bill Todd
Richard III (1995) as 2nd Murderer (uncredited)
Treasure Island (1995) as Billy Bones
Dangerfield (1997, TV Series) as Brian Taylor
The Fix (1997) as Peter Campling
David Copperfield (1999) as Barkis
Metropolis (2000, TV Mini-series) as Brickhill
The Bill (2001) as George Stubbs
Baddiel's Syndrome (2001) as Drugs tsar
EastEnders (2001) as Harry Slater
Out of Bounds (2003) as Lionel Stubbs (final film role)

References

External links

BBC tribute page
Guardian obituary

1946 births
2002 deaths
Alcohol-related deaths in England
Alumni of the Royal Central School of Speech and Drama
English male soap opera actors
English male film actors
English male stage actors
People from Chichester